The Ministry of National Security is a ministry of the Government of South Sudan. Gen. Obuto Mamur Mete was the incumbent minister .

References

National Security
South Sudan, National Security
National security institutions